The International 3300 is a Type-C cowled bus chassis (conventional-style) manufactured by Navistar International, derived from the International DuraStar since 2004 for the United States, Canada, and Mexico.  While most examples are produced as yellow school buses, variants of the 3300 are also produced for commercial applications; International also produces as cutaway-cab variant of the model line.

Developed as the successor to the International 3800 (the final model line of the International S series), the 3300 is a derivative of the International 4300 medium-duty truck (later the Durastar, the International MV since 2019); a single generation has been produced since 2004.

Design overview
In 2001, International introduced the NGV (Next Generation Vehicle) line of trucks, with an all-new 4000-series medium-duty truck line.  For the 2005 model year, the 3300 was introduced as the replacement for the International 3800 (the final model of the long-running International S-Series).  The 3300 shares its powertrain and forward body components with the 4300 medium-duty truck (the replacement for the 4900).  

Though remaining under the same model nomenclature since 2004, the 3300 has followed the model development of the International DuraStar (today, the International MV).

Body manufacturers 

As an effect of the alignment between industry chassis suppliers and school bus body manufacturers, production of the International 3300 has been more directly associated with IC Bus than its 3800 predecessor.  From 2004 to 2008, the 3300 was also bodied by Blue Bird Corporation, who offered it as an additional model alongside its proprietary Blue Bird Vision conventional.    

Since 2009, the 3300 chassis has been bodied by IC Bus exclusively in the United States and Canada.  Navistar also manufactures the chassis for export, though body manufacturers outside North America do not produce school bus bodies for the chassis.

Powertrain
At the time of its introduction, the International 3300 was sold exclusively with Navistar-sourced diesel engines.  For 2008 production, the VT365 and DT466 engines were replaced by the MaxxForce 7 and MaxxForce DT engines, respectively.  Introduced as an option during 2013, Cummins ISB6.7 diesels became the standard diesel engine during 2015.

In 2015, the 3300 expanded to alternative-fuel powertrains, as Navistar introducing a PSI-supplied (Power Solutions International) propane-fuel engine; in 2017, the same engine became available fueled by gasoline.  In 2018, IC Bus introduced a prototype fully-electric bus based on a 3300 chassis, named chargE; the production of the fully-electric vehicle is intended for 2020.

Variants

3300 (low profile) 
From 2004 to 2015, IC Bus produced a Type-B low-profile version of the 3300 chassis, serving as the basis of the IC BE-Series bus.  Produced primarily as a school bus and as its commercial-market derivatives, the BE was designed for operators transporting special-needs passengers.  As an alternative to van-based buses, the BE was designed with a flat-floor interior, maximizing the available space for wheelchair passengers.

3200 
From 2004 to 2015, the cutaway-cab variant of the International DuraStar was produced for bus use, designated the International 3200, replacing the previous-generation 3400 based on the S-Series cab.  Alongside second-party manufacturers, in 2006, IC began production of several types of commercial bodies for the 3200 chassis, including transit shuttle buses, tour buses, limo buses, and low-floor transit buses.

Following the 2010 introduction of the IC AE/AC-Series (based on the smaller International TerraStar), many cutaway International buses adopted IC grille badging, though the 3200 itself was never marketed with a school bus body.

See also 

Navistar International - manufacturer
IC Bus - primary body manufacturer
 List of buses

References

School bus chassis
Navistar International buses
Vehicles introduced in 2001